Redfish  is a common name for several species of fish.

Redish or Red Fish may also refer to:

Places
 Red Fish Island, in island in Galveston Texas
 Redfish Bay, an extension of Aransas Bay in Texas
 Redfish Lake, an alpine lake in central Idaho
 Redfish Pass, a strait in Florida

Other
 Red Fish, a 2003 album by the band The Moondogs
 Red Fish (Oglala), a Native American chief in the 1840s
 Redfish (specification), an Internet protocol
 Redfish (website), a subsidiary of the Russian state-owned video news agency Ruptly

See also 

 Red Fisher (disambiguation)